Christian Gugler (born 1 August 1960) is a Swiss athlete. He competed in the men's decathlon at the 1988 Summer Olympics.

References

1960 births
Living people
Athletes (track and field) at the 1988 Summer Olympics
Swiss decathletes
Olympic athletes of Switzerland
Place of birth missing (living people)